Admiral (ret.) Slamet Soebijanto (born 4 June 1951 in Mojokerto, Indonesia) was the Chief of Naval Staff of the Republic of Indonesia from 18 February 2005 to 7 November 2007. He has received the Bintang Dharma medal given to military officers for service and devotion.

References 

1951 births
Living people
People from Mojokerto